Korpela is a Finnish surname. Notable people with the surname include:

 Ernest J. Korpela (born 1936), American politician
 Eva Korpela (born 1958), Swedish biathlete
 Jorma Korpela (born 1960), Finnish modern pentathlete
 Tommi Korpela (born 1968), Finnish actor
 Merja Korpela (born 1981), hammer thrower from Finland
 Tinja-Riikka Korpela (born 1986), Finnish football goalkeeper

Finnish-language surnames